Milner may refer to:
Milner (surname)
Milner, Colorado, United States
Milner, Georgia, United States
Milner, British Columbia, Canada
Milner baronets, English baronetage

See also
Milner Pass, Colorado, United States
Milner's Kindergarten, a group of British diplomats associated with Alfred, Lord Milner
H. R. Milner Generating Station, a coal-fired station in Alberta, Canada
Millner (disambiguation)